If Women Counted (1988) is a book by New Zealand academic and former politician Marilyn Waring, that is regarded as the "founding document" of the discipline of feminist economics. The book is a groundbreaking and systematic critique of the system of national accounts, the international standard of measuring economic growth, and the ways in which women's unpaid work as well as the value of Nature have been excluded from what counts as productive in the economy.

The book "persuaded the United Nations to redefine gross domestic product, inspired new accounting methods in dozens of countries, and became the founding document of the discipline of feminist economics." A widely cited book, it made the analysis of this topic known to a large audience.

Reception

According to Julie A. Nelson,
"Marilyn Waring's work woke people up.  She showed exactly how the unpaid work traditionally done by women has been made invisible within national accounting systems, and the damage this causes. Her book [...] encouraged and influenced a wide range of work on ways, both numerical and otherwise, of valuing, preserving, and rewarding the work of care that sustains our lives. By pointing to a similar neglect of the natural environment, she also issued a wake-up call to issues of ecological sustainability that have only grown more pressing over time. In recent decades, the field of feminist economics has broadened and widened to encompass these topics and more."

The noted economist John Kenneth Galbraith called If Women Counted "a splendid work... no concerned man or woman can ignore it."

The book is discussed in Melinda Gates' book The Moment of Lift: How Empowering Women Changes the World.

Counting on Marilyn Waring: New Advances in Feminist Economics
Counting on Marilyn Waring: New Advances in Feminist Economics, an anthology edited by Margunn Bjørnholt and Ailsa McKay, was published in 2014, with contributions by a diverse group of scholars on recent advances in the field of feminist economics. It was described by economist Alison Preston as "a timely reminder of the politics and economics underpinning what, how and by whom activities and outputs are valued. For those concerned with social justice and sustainable futures this important and powerful book provides an invaluable and practical insight into issues that are in need of greater visibility." According to the magazine Choice: Current Reviews for Academic Libraries, the book explores "a wide range of issues—including the fundamental meaning of economic growth and activity to consumption, health care, mortality, unpaid household work, mothering, education, nutrition, equality, and sustainability" and reveals "the breadth, depth, and substance that can grow from innovative ideas and critical analysis." Diane Elson argues that "despite many valiant efforts, women do not as yet really count in the conduct of economic policy. This book is an imaginative contribution to an ongoing struggle." In a review in Feminist Economics, Patricia E. Perkins calls the book "a joy to read and a revelation", and "a fitting culmination of [McKay's] lifelong work using economics to advance equity for women." The book is quoted in Melinda Gates' book The Moment of Lift: How Empowering Women Changes the World.

Publication history

Originally published by Harper & Row as If Women Counted with an introduction by Gloria Steinem in 1988, it has since also been published by Macmillan under the same title, and by Allen & Unwin and University of Toronto Press as Counting for Nothing. The book remains most widely known under the title If Women Counted and has been translated into several languages.

At the time she wrote the book, Waring was a visiting fellow at the John F. Kennedy School of Government at Harvard University.

Film adaptation
 The documentary film Who's Counting? Marilyn Waring on Sex, Lies and Global Economics (1995), by Oscar-winning film director Terre Nash, is largely based on the book.

Literature

References 

Feminist books
Books about economic inequality
Feminist economics
Ecofeminism
1988 non-fiction books
Harper & Row books